David Baillie may refer to:

 David Baillie (comics) (born 1977), Scottish comic writer and artist
 David Baillie (footballer) (1905–1967), English football player

See also
David  Bailey (disambiguation)
 David Bailly (1584–1657), Dutch Golden Age painter